Nicolas Fouché (1653–1733) was a French painter.

Fouché was born in Troyes, the son of the painter Léonard Fouché. He was received into the Académie de Saint-Luc on 15 March 1679. The abbé de Monville, biographer of Pierre Mignard, called Fouché one of his students. Cardinal Melchior de Polignac owned a series of paintings of the eight liberal arts by Fouché, inventorised by his heir, in 1738.  He died in Paris.

Works 
 Budapest, Fine Arts Museum, Pomona, oil on canvas, 1, 475 by 1,145 m.

 Tours, musée des Beaux-arts, La Poèsie, at the château de Chanteloup prior to the revolution, oil on canvas, 1,10 by 0,81 m.

Engravers of his work 
 Louis Desplaces (1682–1739)
 Audran family
 Gérard Edelinck
 James Johnson

Bibliography 
 Wildenstein, "Nicolas Fouché peintre de l'Académie de Saint-Luc vers 1650-1733", Gazette des Beaux-Arts, novembre 1964, n° 3.
 David Brouzet, "La Poésie du Musée des Beaux-Arts de Tours attribuée à Nicolas Fouché", Les Cahiers d'histoire de l'art, 2007.

1653 births
1733 deaths
People from Troyes
17th-century French painters
French male painters
18th-century French painters
18th-century French male artists